Chang Hsiu-ching (Tâi-lô: Tiunn Siù-khing born 28 May 1970) is a Taiwanese Hokkien pop singer known for her love songs. She won the 1994 Golden Melody Award for Best Dialect Female Artist.

References

External links

1970 births
Living people
People from Pingtung County
Taiwanese Hokkien pop singers
Taiwanese women singer-songwriters
20th-century Taiwanese women singers
21st-century Taiwanese women singers